The Hauts-de-Seine General Council (French: Conseil général des Hauts-de-Seine) is the deliberative assembly of the Hauts-de-Seine department. 
It consists of 46 members (general councilors) and its headquarters are 
in Nanterre, capital of the department, and the president is Patrick Devedjian. 
The general councilors are elected for a 6-years term. The Hauts-de-Seine general council includes 8 vice-presidents.

The president  
The president of the General Council is currently Patrick Devedjian.

The vice-presidents 
 Jean-Yves Bony , 1st vice-president 
 Sylvie Lachaize , 2nd vice-president 
 Bernard Delcros , 3rd vice-president

The general councilors 
The General Council consists of 46 general councilors (conseillers généraux) who come from the 15 cantons of Hauts-de-Seine.

Visual identity (logo)

See also 

 Hauts-de-Seine 
 General councils of France

Website  
  Hauts-de-Seine General Council 

Hauts-de-Seine
Departmental councils (France)
 

fr:Conseil général des Hauts-de-Seine